All Saints' Church is the Anglican parish church of the town of Fleet in the county of Hampshire, England. It is notable for its architect, William Burges and was constructed 1861–2.

History and description
The church was designed by Burges and was built between 1861 and 1862. It was extended to the west in 1934 by A. J. Steadman and a Lady Chapel was added in 1958 by John Purser.  The church was commissioned by the local squire, Charles Edward Lefroy, secretary to the Speaker of the House of Commons as a memorial to his wife,  Janet Lefroy.  It cost £3,323. It has been listed Grade II* on the National Heritage List for England since June 1987.

Pevsner says of Fleet that "it has no shape, nor character nor notable buildings, except one", that one being All Saints. The church is of red brick and its plan is "simple in the extreme."  The interior too is simply decorated  but the massive sculpture, particularly of the Lefroys' tomb and of the gabled arch below which it originally sat is quintessentially Burges, "not so much muscular (gothic) as muscle-bound".  Janet Lefroy was originally a Walker, daughter of James Walker, who established the great marine engineering company of Walker and Burges with Alfred Burges, father of William.  This family connection led to Burges obtaining the commission.

The interior was significantly altered in the later twentieth century by the removal of the Lefroy tomb from its original position and by the whitewashing of the apse. Of these alterations, Pevsner comments; "And so a work by a none too prolific genius is irreparably spoiled."

Fire

Far greater damage was caused in 2015 by an arson attack. On 22 June the roof and much of the interior was destroyed by a major fire. Daniel Finnerty, a seventeen-year-old local, was subsequently arrested for suspected arson. In November 2015, at Winchester Crown Court, Finnerty pleaded guilty to two charges of arson and was sentenced to four years in a Youth Offender Institution (reduced to  years on appeal) and to a three-year extended licence.

Notes

References
Pevsner, Nicholas and Lloyd, David, Hampshire and the Isle of Wight, The Buildings of England, Penguin (1967)
Mordaunt Crook, J, William Burges and the High Victorian Dream, James Murray (1981)

External links
 

1862 establishments in England
Churches completed in 1862
Fleet, All Saints
Gothic Revival architecture in Hampshire
Gothic Revival church buildings in England
Fleet, Hart
Fleet
Religious buildings and structures in the United Kingdom destroyed by arson
William Burges church buildings
2015 fires in the United Kingdom